The 1977 Harvard Crimson football team was an American football team that represented Harvard University during the 1977 NCAA Division I football season. Harvard tied for third place in the Ivy League.

In their seventh year under head coach Joe Restic, the Crimson compiled a 4–5 record and were outscored 173 to 153. Steven J. Kaseta was the team captain.

Harvard's 4–3 conference record earned a three-way tie for third in the Ivy League standings. The Crimson outscored Ivy opponents 132 to 118. 

Harvard played its home games at Harvard Stadium in the Allston neighborhood of Boston, Massachusetts.

Schedule

References

Harvard
Harvard Crimson football seasons
Harvard Crimson football
Harvard Crimson football